Mordellistena puberula is a species of beetle in the genus Mordellistena of the family Mordellidae. It was described by Maeklin in 1875.

References

Beetles described in 1875
puberula